The BB I was a steam locomotive with the Royal Bavarian State Railways (Königlich Bayerische Staatsbahn). 

This one-off loco would have been given the operating number 55 7101 by the Reichsbahn in their initial renumbering plan, but in the final one it did not appear as it had been retired in 1924. It can be seen in section today in the Nuremberg Transport Museum. 

The engine was initially equipped with a Bavarian 3 T 13,8 tender, later replaced by a Class 2'2' T 18.

See also
Royal Bavarian State Railways
List of Bavarian locomotives and railbuses

Mallet locomotives
BB I
Maffei locomotives
Standard gauge locomotives of Germany
0-4-4-0 locomotives
B′B n4v locomotives

Freight locomotives